The Qinglan Bridge is a bridge in Wenchang, Hainan, China. It connects Qinglan Town and Dongjiao Town by crossing over the Qinglan Bay.

This cable-stayed bridge has two A-shaped towers that are 105.81 meters high. It has 6 lanes for automobile traffic and a 2-metre side lane at the edges for small vehicles and pedestrians. The speed limit is 80 km/h.

The total investment was 595 million RMB.

The bridge will also be used for transportation related to the Wenchang Satellite Launch Center. It is considered the most earthquake-resistant bridge in China, being able to handle one at a magnitude of 8.5 on the Richter scale.

References

External links

Road bridges in China
Bridges in Hainan
Transport in Hainan
Bridges completed in 2012
2012 establishments in China